Colin Meldrum may refer to:

 Colin Meldrum (footballer, born 1941), Scottish football player and manager (Reading)
 Colin Meldrum (footballer, born 1975), Scottish football goalkeeper and coach (Kilmarnock)